The M1 helmet is a combat helmet that was used by the U.S. military from World War II until 1985, when it was succeeded by the PASGT helmet. The M1 helmet has become an icon of the US military, with its design inspiring other militaries around the world.

History

Development

At the entry of the United States into World War I, the US military was without a combat helmet; initially US troops arriving in Europe were issued with British Mk I Brodie helmets, and those integrated with French units were given French M15 Adrian helmets. The United States quickly commenced manufacture of a version of the Mk I, designated the M1917, producing some 2,700,000 by the end of hostilities. At that point, the shortcomings of the M1917, which lacked balance and protection of the head from lateral fire, resulted in a project to produce a better helmet which would also have a distinctively American appearance. Between 1919 and 1920, a number of new designs of helmets were tested by the Infantry Board in comparative trials along with the M1917 and helmets of other armies. One of those designs, the Helmet Number 5A, was selected for further study. This was an improved version of the Helmet Number 5, developed in 1917 and 1918 by Bashford Dean, the curator of arms and armor at the Metropolitan Museum of Art, which had been rejected during the war because of its supposed resemblance to the German stahlhelm. Eventually, tests held at Fort Benning between 1924 and 1926 showed that although the 5A offered better side protection than the M1917, it was more easily penetrated from above and in some circumstances the shape of the helmet could interfere with properly holding and firing a rifle. Further ballistic tests at the Aberdeen Proving Ground resulted in the decision to retain the M1917 in 1934, which was then given a redesigned leather cradle and designated the M1917A1 or "Kelly" helmet.

In 1940, with World War II raging on in Europe and Asia, it seemed likely that the United States might soon be at war again. The Infantry Board resurrected the quest to find a better type of helmet, since the ongoing conflict had shown that the M1917, designed to protect men standing in trenches from falling shell splinters and shrapnel, would be inadequate on the modern battlefield. The board reported:

Accordingly, the board, under the direction of Brigadier General Courtney Hodges, took the M1917 shell as the basis of the new prototype, trimmed off the brim and added a visor and skirt-like extensions to protect the back and sides of the wearer's head. Rejecting the conventional systems of cradles, the new helmet was given a Riddell type liner and suspension system, based on the contemporary style of football helmet, with an adjustable strap for the nape of the neck to prevent the helmet from rocking. The resulting prototype was designated the TS-3, and the McCord Radiator Company manufactured the first examples from Hadfield steel. In tests, they were found to be able to resist a .45 ACP pistol bullet fired at point-blank range, exceeding the initial specification. The TS-3 was given official approval on June 6, 1941 and was designated "Helmet, Steel, M1". Full scale production commenced almost immediately.

Service
Over 22 million U.S. M1 steel helmets were manufactured through September 1945. Production was done by McCord Radiator and Manufacturing Company and Schlueter Manufacturing Company; the former developed a method to create an almost eighteen-centimeter deep bowl in a single pressing, which was an engineering milestone at the time.

Total production per year during the period 1941-45 :

- 1941 : 323 510

- 1942 : 5 001 384

- 1943 : 7 648 880

- 1944 : 5 703 520

- 1945 : 3 685 721

In 1944, the stainless steel helmet rim with a seam at the front was replaced by a manganese steel rim with a rear seam, as well as the helmet bails being changed from a fixed, welded version to a swivel model in 1942, along with slight alterations to the shaping of the side brim. Further M1 helmets were manufactured for the Korean War.

Production continued during the Cold War era with periodic improvements; in 1955 a grommet in the front of the liner was deleted, in 1964 the liner construction was changed to laminated nylon and a new chinstrap design was introduced in 1975. The final contract for US M1 helmets was placed in 1976. The M1 was phased out of US service during the 1980s in favor of the PASGT helmet, which offered increased ergonomics and ballistic protection.

Following World War II, the M1 helmet was widely adopted or copied by numerous other countries and its distinctive shape was adopted as the NATO standard. Postwar analysis of wartime casualty figures by the US Army Operations Research Office found that 54 percent of hits to the M1 helmet failed to penetrate, and estimated that 70,000 men had been saved from death or injury by wearing it.

Design

The M1 is a combination of two "one-size-fits-all" helmets—an outer metal shell, sometimes called the "steel pot", and a hard hat–type liner nestled inside it featuring an adjustable suspension system. Helmet covers and netting would be applied by covering the steel shell with the extra material tucked inside the shell and secured by inserting the liner.

The outer shell should not be worn by itself. The liner can be worn by itself, providing protection similar to a hard hat, and was often worn in such fashion by military policemen, Assistant Drill Instructors (known as AIs), and rifle/machine gun/pistol range staff, although they were supposed to wear steel at the range. The liner is sometimes worn in U.S. military ceremonies and parades, painted white or chromed.

Shell

Construction

The non-magnetic Hadfield manganese steel for M1 helmet shells was smelted at the Carnegie Steel Company or the Sharon Steel Company of Pennsylvania. After being poured into fifteen-ton ingots (also called "heats"), the steel was divided into 216-inch by 36-inch by 4-inch blocks, known as "lifts," which were then cut into three equal 72-inch pieces to make them easier to handle. The cut lifts were sent to the Gary Works in Gary, Indiana for further processing, after which they were each reduced into 250 68-inch by 36-inch by 0.044-inch sheets, which were cut into 16.5-inch circles. The helmet discs were oiled and banded into lots of 400 for delivery by rail to McCord or Schlueter for pressing and final assembly.

Each "heat" of steel was assigned a unique number by the smelter, as was each of its "lifts." When each new heat was unloaded at McCord or Schlueter, it was assigned a sequential number, and each lift within the heat was assigned a letter of the alphabet (for example, the third lift unloaded of the forty-ninth heat received by McCord would be 49C). This unique "lot and lift" number was stamped onto each helmet produced from the discs of a particular lift, and allowed for traceability in case the helmets exhibited defects. The "lot and lift" number is in reference to the time when the fabricator received the helmet discs, not when they were made into finished helmets. Lifts of heats were not loaded onto or unloaded from railcars in any particular order, and were often warehoused (also in no particular order) before being finished.

The helmet discs were drawn to a depth of seven inches to create the rough helmet shape, or "shell," and the edges were trimmed. The edge of the shell has a crimped metal rim running around it, which provides a smooth edge. This is usually known as the "rim". The rim has a seam where the ends of the strip meet. On the earliest shells the seam met at the front. This was moved to the back of the rim in November 1944 At this time, the rim also went from being made of stainless steel to manganese steel. On each side of the shell, there are stainless steel loops for the chinstrap. Early World War II production shells had fixed, rectangular loops, and mid-war to 1960s helmets feature movable rectangular loops. This feature was adopted in 1943 to address the problem that when earlier helmets were dropped, the fixed loops were more susceptible to breaking off. Early shells for paratrooper helmets feature fixed, D-shaped loops. The shells were then painted with flat olive drab paint, with the paint on the outside of the shell sprinkled with either finely ground cork (World War II era) or silica sand (postwar).

World War II-production helmets feature sewn-on cotton web olive drab shade 3 chinstraps, replaced gradually throughout 1943 and 1944 with olive drab shade 7 chinstraps. 1950s and later production chinstraps are made of olive drab webbing attached to the loops with removable metal clips. Nylon chinstraps were introduced in the U.S. military in 1975. These straps featured a two-piece web chin cup and were fastened by a metal snap rather than buckle.

Uses

Many soldiers wore the webbing chinstraps unfastened or looped around the back of the helmet and clipped together. This practice arose for two reasons: First, because hand-to-hand combat was anticipated, and an enemy could be expected to attack from behind, reach over the helmet, grab its visor, and pull. If the chinstrap were worn, the head would be snapped back, causing the victim to lose balance, and leave the throat and stomach exposed to a knife thrust. Secondly, many men incorrectly believed that a nearby exploding bomb or artillery shell could cause the chinstrap to break their neck when the helmet was caught in its concussive force, although a replacement buckle, the T1 pressure-release buckle, was manufactured that allowed the chinstrap to release automatically should this occur. In place of the chinstrap, the nape strap inside the liner was counted on to provide sufficient contact to keep the helmet from easily falling off the wearer's head.

The design of the bowl-like shell led to some novel uses:  When separated from the liner, the shell could be used as an entrenching tool, a hammer, washbasin, bucket, bowl, and as a seat. The shell was also used as a cooking pot, but the practice was discouraged as it would make the metal alloy brittle.

Liner

Construction

The liner is a hard hat-like support for the suspension, and is designed to fit snugly inside the steel shell.

The first liners were produced in June 1941 and designed by Hawley Products Company. The suspension was initially made from strips of silver rayon webbing stretched around and across the inside of the liner. A sweatband is clipped onto these, and is adjusted to fit around the head of the wearer. Three triangular bands of rayon meet at the top of the helmet, where they were adjusted by a shoestring to fit the height and shape of the wearer's head. A snap-on nape strap cushioned the liner against the back of the wearer's neck and stops it from falling off. As the rayon had a tendency to stretch and not recover its shape, the suspension material was later changed to olive drab number 3, and then olive drab number 7, herringbone twill cotton webbing.

World War II and Korean War-era liners have their own chinstrap made from brown leather. The liner chinstrap does not have loops like the shell; it was either riveted directly to the inside of the liner (early examples) or snapped onto studs. It can still swivel inside the liner. The chinstrap is usually seen looped over the brim of the shell, and helps to keep it in place when its own chinstraps are not in use.

Early liners were made from a mix of compressed paper fibers impregnated with phenolic resin, with olive drab cotton twill fabric stretched over the outside. They were discontinued in November 1942 because they degraded quickly in high heat and high humidity environments. They were replaced by evolving plastic liners, using a process developed by the Inland Division of General Motors. These liners were made of strips of cotton cloth bathed in phenolic resin and draped in a star shape over a liner-shaped mold, where they were subjected to pressure to form a liner. The initial "low pressure" process was deemed unacceptable by the Army, but accepted out of need. These liners were made by St. Clair Manufacturing and Hood Rubber Company. Hawley, Hood, and St. Clair's contracts were cancelled by early 1944, when a "high pressure" process which produced better-quality liners became commercially viable. Companies which produced "high pressure" liners during World War II included Westinghouse Electric & Manufacturing Company, Firestone Tire and Rubber Company, CAPAC Manufacturing, Inland (whose molds were acquired by Firestone after their contract was cancelled), Mine Safety Appliances Company, Seaman Paper Company, and International Molded Plastics, Inc.

Liners essentially identical in construction to "high pressure" World War II examples were produced between 1951 and 1954 during the Korean War by the Micarta Division of Westinghouse and CAPAC Manufacturing. In the 1960s, the M1 helmet liner was redesigned, eliminating the leather chinstrap, nape strap, and changing the suspension webbing to a pattern resembling an asterisk in a coarse cotton web material in lieu of the earlier cotton herringbone twill. In the early 1970s, suspension materials changed to a thicker, more flexible nylon with a rougher unbeveled rim.  Later changes included a move to a yellow and green material for liner construction.

Paratrooper liners

M1 helmet liners intended for use by paratroopers had a different construction. The short piece of webbing which held the nape strap at the back of the wearer's neck was extended around the sides of the liner, and terminated on each side in "A" shaped yokes which hung down below the rim of the liner and had buckles for an adjustable chin cup made of molded leather. Two female snaps on the inside of the liner above the "A" yokes accepted male snaps on each of the steel shell's chinstraps, and helped to keep the liner inside the steel shell during abrupt or violent movements.

Accessories

Cover 

In late 1942, the United States Marine Corps used a cloth helmet cover with a camouflage pattern for its helmets. The cover was made from cotton herringbone twill fabric. It had a "forest green" pattern on one side and a "brown coral island" pattern on the other.

The United States Army often utilized nets to reduce the helmets' shine when wet and to allow burlap scrim or vegetation to be added for camouflage purposes.  Most nets were acquired from British or Canadian Army stocks or cut from larger camouflage nets. The Army did not adopt an official issue net until the "Net, Helmet, with Band" that included an elastic neoprene band to keep it in place.

After World War II, no new covers were issued and at the start of the Korean War, many soldiers had to improvise covers from burlap sandbags or parachute fabric. A consignment of 100,000 olive drab covers was dispatched to the theater, but the ship carrying them, sank in a collision en route and they were all lost. In 1963, the Army and Marine Corps adopted a reversible fabric cover called the Mitchel Pattern, with a leafy green pattern on one side and orange and brown cloud pattern on the other. This type was nearly omnipresent in Vietnam, where, for the first time, the Army wore the cloth camouflage as general issue. In Vietnam, the green portion of the reversible fabric camouflage was normally worn outermost. Helmet covers in the (European) woodland camouflage, were designed for fighting in the European Theater of Operations (NATO), and became the post-Vietnam (jungle pattern) camouflage cover used by the US military from the late 1970s onward.  The (European) Woodland pattern was not reversible; they were only printed on one side, though some rare desert camouflage examples do exist. These covers were all constructed from two semi-circular pieces of cloth stitched together to form a dome-like shape conforming to the helmet's shape. They were secured to the helmet by folding their open ends into the steel pot, and then placing the liner inside, trapping the cloth between the pot and the liner. An olive green elastic band, intended to hold additional camouflage materials, was often worn around the helmet to further hold the cover in place.

Other armies used these or similar covers printed with different camouflage patterns, or employed entirely different methods. In the Dutch Army, for example, it was common practice to use a square piece of burlap as a helmet cover on M1 helmets, usually secured by a net and a wide rubber band.

During the Battle of the Bulge and Korean War, soldiers made white helmet covers as camouflage in snowy areas. They were not issued to soldiers, so many soldiers simply made them from a white cloth from a shirt or tablecloth.

Users

Current

 : Being replaced. Still in use by Border Guard Bangladesh and other forces.
 : Some M1s still in service by Military Police and ceremonial units.
 : Only used by Dominican military honor guard forces.
 : Made locally and are still in service.
 : Limited use by the Indonesian Armed Forces and the Indonesian Police for Ceremonial purposes, still in use by the Indonesian Military Police.
 : Uses the West German-made M1s.
 : Used only in the Guatemalan Army and Navy.
 : Uses the Type 66 helmet, modeled after the M1 helmet that was supplied to the JSDF. Currently used in non-combat operations. Formerly used M1s supplied by the US to the JSDF before the adoption of the Type 66.
 : Formerly used by former Panamanian military, now in use by Panamanian Public Forces.
 
 : Used in the Korean War. Uses M1-style ballistic helmets made by Silver Star.
 : Ceremonial units in chrome finish.
 : Used by the Army and Military Police – info provided by damians war collection (January 1, 2022)
: Used by the Turkish military, most made locally. Still used as ceremonial helmet
 : Used US M1 for 1944 to present received by the EDA (Excess Defense Article) 1942 – 1945, FMS (Foreign Military Sales) and MAP (Military Aid Program) with some still in use, and M1-style ballistic helmets for South Korean-made (M76).
 : Some M1s used by the Vietnamese military.

Former

 : Used by the Argentine military before they were replaced.
 : Australian Defence Force previously used Australian and American-made M1s from the 1960s to the 1990s. Replaced by the Australian-made M91 PASGT helmet in the 1990s.
 : Used by the Austrian Army after it was reformed in 1955 with 30,000 M1s supplied by the US. Copies made in 1958 known as Stahlhelm 2 (M.58) with another made in the 1970s with a German-made helmet suspension, all made by Ulbrichts Witwe.
 : Used Ulbrichts-made M1 helmets.
 : Used surplus M1 helmets complete with ERDL pattern or U.S. Woodland from various sources during the Bosnian War.
 : Formerly used US and Brazilian-made M1s for its military.
 : Formerly used by the Royal Hong Kong Police Force.
 : Used US, Brazilian, and South Korean-made M1s before being removed from service.
 : Used until the 1990s, when it was replaced by the CG634 helmet.
 : Formerly used by the Chilean military with liners made by Baselli Hnos.
 : Used in the Second Sino-Japanese War and in the Chinese Civil War. Used by Taiwan until the 1990s.
 : Used surplus M1 helmets complete with ERDL pattern or U.S. Woodland from various sources during the Croatian War of Independence.
 : Formerly used US-made M1 helmets.
 : Used in Cuban military until Bastista was deposed, replaced by Warsaw Pact-made helmets.
 : Used Ulbrichts-made M1 helmets under the designation of Staalhjelm model 48 (m/48).
 : Formerly in use by the Ecuadorian military.
 : Provided by the US in the 1970s as part of military aid, now replaced by PASGT.
 : Adopted by the Greek Army in 1952.
 : Used by former Haitian military.
 : Formerly used by Honduran military after signing the Rio Treaty.
 : Formerly used by the Imperial Iranian Army. Used by the Islamic Republic of Iran's army, until retirement, however it occasionally still sees some limited use.
 : Formerly used by the Israeli military, supplied by the UK, France, and the United States. Some M1s used have a combination of US and Israeli parts.
 : Used American-made M1s.
 : Formerly used by the Mexican military.
 :Used by Malaysian Army and Royal Malaysia Police.
 : Used by the New Zealand Army from the 1960s all the way to 2000s, mostly using US and South Korean-made M1s.
 : Used Ulbrichts-made M1 helmets.
 : The Guardia Nacional de Nicaragua used M1 helmets supplied by the United States 1954-1979.
 : Used Ulbrichts-made M1 helmets.
 :Formerly used by the Pakistan Army. Replaced by GIDs ballistic helmets. 
 : Adopted the M1 after signing the Rio Treaty.
 : Formerly used M1 helmets supplied by the US. Some obtained from Israel and West Germany.
 : Formerly used M1 helmet in the Armed Forces of the Philippines. Some reserve stocks for training of the recruits.
 : Formerly used M1 helmets supplied via South Korea and Taiwan.
 : Formerly used by the Singaporean military from the late 1950s with inner liners made locally. Used up until the mid-1980s, when they began to be gradually replaced, and finally phased out, by a similar helmet to the US PASGT helmet, in the 1990s.
 : Used M1s made from America and Europe, modified for marine and paratrooper forces.
 : The standard helmet of the South Vietnamese military from 1955 up until the fall of the country to North Vietnam in 1975, all throughout the Vietnam War.
  : Formerly used by the Royal Thai Police's Crime Suppression Division.
 : Formerly used by the United States Air Force as the M3 and later, the M5, helmet for flak protection. Formerly used by the US military from the 1940s to the 80s, replaced by the PASGT.
 : Used by the Venezuelan military, now replaced. Majority made in the US and South Korea.
 : Formerly used by the West German army, helmets made by F. W. Quist Company. The West German M-62 Stahlhelm was a direct copy of the U.S. M1 helmet. It was properly called "zweiteiliger Stahlhelm" (two-piece steel helmet). In 1958 the helmet was made as a one-piece helmet and renamed Stahlhelm M1A1. The M1A1 came in three sizes: 66, 68, and 71. This helmet was used until 1981 when a modified version was released and renamed the Helm1A1. Modifications included a 3-point chin strap with the third point connecting at the nape, extra large sizes, and a further adjustable liner. The M1A1 Stahlhelm remained in service until 1992 when the Bundeswehr replaced it with a PASGT-derived kevlar helmet called the Gefechtshelm ("Combat helmet").

See also
 M1C helmet
 Modèle 1951 helmet
 Iraqi M80 helmet

References

Books

Journals

External links

 
 
 Are Navy Helmets Bulletproof? Battleship New Jersey, Youtube - Show and tell video of M1 helmet and US Navy Mk II talker helmet

1940s fashion
20th-century fashion
21st-century fashion
International Hat Company
Combat helmets of the United States
World War II military equipment of the United States
Canadian military uniforms
Combat helmets of Canada
Military equipment introduced from 1940 to 1944